The 1976 Toledo Rockets football team was an American football team that represented the University of Toledo in the Mid-American Conference (MAC) during the 1976 NCAA Division I football season. In their sixth and final season under head coach Jack Murphy, the Rockets compiled a 3–8 record (2–6 against MAC opponents), finished in a tie for seventh place in the MAC, and were outscored by all opponents by a combined total of 232 to 185.

The team's statistical leaders included Jeff Hepinstall with 1,299 passing yards, Skip McCulley with 578 rushing yards, and Scott Resseguie with 530 receiving yards.

Schedule

References

Toledo
Toledo Rockets football seasons
Toledo Rockets football